John Edwin Shaw (born March 17, 1968) is a United States Space Force lieutenant general who has served as the deputy commander of the United States Space Command since November 2020. He previously served as commander of the Combined Force Space Component Command and deputy commander of Space Operations Command.

Early life and education

John Edwin Shaw was born on March 17, 1968. Raised in Norton, Massachusetts, he is a distinguished graduate from the United States Air Force Academy in 1990 with a B.S. degree in astronautical engineering and a minor in Russian language. He later earned an M.S. degree in aeronautics and astronautics from the University of Washington in 1991 with a thesis entitled Optimal Control Designs for an Inverted Cart-Pendulum Array. He went on to receive two M.A. degrees in 1998 and 2004: one in organizational management from George Washington University and one in military operational arts and sciences from Air Command and Staff College, respectively. He also completed a M.S. degree in national security strategy in 2008 from the National War College. He was also a senior executive fellow of the Harvard Kennedy School in 2010.

Military career

After graduating from the United States Air Force Academy, Shaw was commissioned into the United States Air Force on May 30, 1990. For a year, he studied at the University of Washington.

His first operational assignment was at the 1st Space Operations Squadron from 1991 to 1994 where he was the deputy crew commander and spacecraft systems engineer. In October 1994, he was assigned as the flight commander and chief of mission analysis at the Mission Control Complex IX, Operating Division 4, Onizuka Air Force Station in California. From 1996 to 1998, he was an intern in the Office of the Deputy Under Secretary of Defense for Space and the Office of the Assistant Secretary of the Air Force for Acquisition at the Pentagon, Washington, D.C.

Shaw was assigned to locations outside the United States from 1998 to 2001. He was first assigned to Ramstein Air Base, Germany for a year as the chief of special information warfare plans for the 32nd Air Operations Group. He was then deployed for two months to Naples, Italy where he was chief of special technical operations for Joint Task Force Noble Anvil during the Kosovo War. After that, he was assigned as the executive officer for director of aerospace operations of the United States Air Forces in Europe.

In 2001, Shaw became a field grade officer, having been promoted to major, and was reassigned to the Air Force headquarters as the deputy chief of the strategy branch in the Directorate for Space Operations and Integration. For a year after that, he was a speechwriter for the secretary of the Air Force and chief of staff, assigned to their executive action group. He spent almost a year at the Air Command and Staff College where he earned an M.A. degree. From 2004 to 2005, he served as the first operations officer for the newly activated 25th Space Control Tactics Squadron. After such tour, he was promoted to lieutenant colonel. He took command of the 4th Space Operations Squadron in June 2005 from Ronald L. Huntley, which he commanded for two years. After his first command duty, he spent a year as a student at the National War College where he completed an M.S. degree in national security strategy.

Shaw was then promoted to colonel in 2008 and assigned as director of the United States Strategic Command commander's action group, serving under General Kevin P. Chilton. On July 1, 2010, he took command of the 50th Operations Group. After two years, he was assigned to the Office of the Deputy Assistant Secretary of Defense (Space Policy) as a senior policy advisor.

After his assignment in Washington, Shaw took command of the 21st Space Wing on July 26, 2013. On June 5, 2015, before relinquishing command to Douglas Schiess, he was promoted to brigadier general. From June 2015 to June 2017, he was assigned to the U.S. Strategic Command as the deputy director for global operations. After that, he was reassigned to the Air Force Space Command first as the director of strategic plans, programs, requirements, and analysis from 2017 to 2018 and then as deputy commander of the major command from 2018 to 2019 after he was promoted to major general.

Shaw took over command of the Combined Force Space Component Command and Fourteenth Air Force after he and Major General Stephen N. Whiting traded their current positions, with Whiting taking over Shaw's position as deputy commander of the Air Force Space Command. On December 20, 2019, with the establishment of the United States Space Force, the Fourteenth Air Force was temporarily redesignated as the Space Operations Command. On October 21, 2020, the Space Operations Command in Vandenberg Air Force Base was inactivated prior to the activation of a separate Space Operations Command, a new field command for which Shaw became the deputy commander.

On September 30, 2020, Shaw was nominated for transfer to the Space Force, promotion to lieutenant general, and assignment as deputy commander of the United States Space Command. He relinquished command of the Combined Force Space Component Command on November 16, 2020, to Major General DeAnna Burt. He was promoted and transferred to the Space Force on November 23, 2020, in a ceremony at the U.S. Air Force Academy and took on duties as deputy commander the next day.

Awards and decorations

Shaw is the recipient of the following awards:

 General Jerome F. O'Malley Distinguished Space Leadership Award
 Associate Fellow, American Institute of Aeronautics and Astronautics
 National Finalist, White House Fellow Program
 Royal Air Force Historical Society and U.S. Air Force Historical Foundation "Two Air Forces" Award for Writing (1998)

Dates of promotion

Personal life
Shaw is married to Tonia Shaw.

Writings

Books

Articles

Thesis

References

External links

|-

Living people
Place of birth missing (living people)
Space Operations Command personnel
United States Air Force generals
United States Air Force Academy alumni
University of Washington alumni
George Washington University alumni
Air University (United States Air Force) alumni
National War College alumni
Harvard Kennedy School alumni
Recipients of the Air Force Distinguished Service Medal
Recipients of the Defense Superior Service Medal
Recipients of the Legion of Merit
United States Space Force generals
1968 births